The following lists events that happened during 2009 in Cambodia.

Incumbents 
 Monarch: Norodom Sihamoni 
 Prime Minister: Hun Sen

Events

February
 February 17 - Former Khmer Rouge leader Kang Kek Iew stands trial before the Extraordinary Chambers in Cambodia.

April
 April 3 - Four soldiers die as Thailand's Army and Cambodia's Army exchange gunfire near the Preah Vihear Temple.

July
 July 28 - AIDS campaigners and human rights groups accuse the Cambodian government of herding HIV-affected families into an "Aids colony" outside Phnom Penh.

September
 September 19 - Pro and anti government protestors demonstrate in the Thai capital Bangkok and near the Preah Vihear Temple along the border with Cambodia.

October
 October 11 - At least 10 people die and seven are declared missing in a river ferry sinking on the Mekong in Kratié Province.

November
 November 4 - The Cambodian government announces that ousted Prime Minister of Thailand Thaksin Shinawatra has been appointed as a government adviser.
 November 5 - Thailand and Cambodia recall their ambassadors over the Cambodian government appointment of former Thai Prime Minister Thaksin Shinawatra.
 November 10 - Thailand's ousted Prime Minister Thaksin Shinawatra arrives in Cambodia to take up his new appointment as economic adviser to the Cambodian government.
 November 11 - Cambodia rejects a request by Thailand to extradite ousted Thai Prime Minister Thaksin Shinawatra.
 November 13 - Cambodia detains a Thai man on charges of spying for Thailand.
 November 19 - Cambodia takes control of a Thai-owned air traffic control firm in a deepening diplomatic row between the two countries.
 November 23 - The war crimes trial of the Khmer Rouge in Cambodia hears its final arguments.

December
 December 19 - The Cambodian government expels 22 Chinese Muslim Uyghurs who arrived in the country back to China, despite criticism from the UN.

See also
List of Cambodian films of 2009

References

 
Years of the 21st century in Cambodia
Cambodia
2000s in Cambodia
Cambodia